The Belle Fourche Experiment Farm, located northwest of Newell, South Dakota off Highway 79, was listed on the National Register of Historic Places in 1976.

It is an experimental farm of the U.S. Department of Agriculture which has also known as the Newell Field Station.

References

Experimental farms in the United States
Farms in South Dakota
Buildings and structures completed in 1907
National Register of Historic Places in Butte County, South Dakota
Research institutes in South Dakota